Guernsey Rovers A.C. is a multi sport based on the Channel Island of Guernsey at Port Soif.

Football, Cricket and Archery currently take place on the 11 acres that make up  their Port Soif home with 7 acres maintained for sport.

The Football teams are affiliated to the Guernsey Football Association and play in the all of the GFA affiliated leagues.

The Cricket teams are affiliated to the Guernsey Cricket Association which itself is an associate member of the International Cricket Council (ICC).

Archery is undertaken on a dedicated 110m range with an annual international shoot taking each September.

History
They won the Priaulx League (1st team) for the first time in their history on May 6, 2017. Three weeks previously they won the Jackson
League (2nd team) making a rare double in Guernsey football.

References

External links
 Official website

Football clubs in Guernsey